The Drut, Druts or Druć is a river in Belarus, a right tributary of Dnieper. It originates in the Orsha Upland in the Belarusian Ridge and flows through Vitebsk, Mogilev and Homiel provinces of Belarus.

The cities of Tolochin and Rogachev are located on the Drut.

References

Rivers of Gomel Region
Rivers of Mogilev Region
Rivers of Vitebsk Region
Rivers of Belarus